Douglas Turner Day III (1 May 1932 – 10 October 2004) was an American novelist, biographer, scholar and critic. He was a popular professor of English literature at the University of Virginia, where he taught for almost four decades.

Early life 

Douglas Day was born in Colón, Panama. The son of a US Navy officer, he served as a fighter pilot in the US Marine Corps in the early 1950s. He took three degrees at the University of Virginia before joining the English faculty there in 1962.

Career 

Day taught at the University of Virginia for 38 years; he was an early advocate of studying contemporary Hispanic and Latin American writers and literature. His study of the poetry of Robert Graves, his first book of literary criticism, won the Phi Beta Kappa Prize for scholarly writing in 1963. Fluent in Spanish, he also edited a collection of plays by Federico Garcia Lorca.

Day documented the turbulent life of English novelist Malcolm Lowry, the alcoholic author of Under the Volcano. For that he shared the 1974 National Book Award in Biography.

Previously, he and Lowry's widow Margerie edited the novelist's posthumous novel Dark as the Grave Wherein My Friend is Laid (1969).

In 1973 he edited a 'restored' and definitive version of William Faulkner's Flags in the Dust, which was originally published in truncated form as Sartoris.

Other books by Douglas Day include Swifter than Reason: The Poetry and Criticism of Robert Graves (1963) and two novels: Journey of the Wolf (1977)— for which he received the Rosenthal Award for Fiction from the American Academy of Arts and Letters; and The Prison Notebooks of Ricardo Flores Magon (1991).

Bibliography 

 The Prison Notebooks of Ricardo Flores Magon. New York: Harcourt Brace Jovanovich, 1991. .
 Journey of the Wolf. New York: Atheneum, 1977. . 
 Malcolm Lowry: A Biography. Oxford: Oxford University Press, 1973. .
 William Faulkner's Flags in the Dust (1973); editor.
 Swifter than Reason: The Poetry and Criticism of Robert Graves. Chapel Hill: University of North Carolina Press, 1963.
 Malcolm Lowry's Dark as the Grave Wherein My Friend is Laid (1969); editor, with Margerie Lowry.

Notes

References 
 
 Fox, Margalit. "Douglas Day, 72, Malcolm Lowry Biographer is Dead." New York Times, 19 October 2004.
 Sullivan, Patricia. "Douglas T. Day III; Writer, Educator." The Washington Post, 16 October 2004.

External links 
 Douglas Day
 Swifter Than Reason: The Poetry and Criticism of Robert Graves by Douglas Day

1932 births
2004 deaths
American male biographers
National Book Award winners
20th-century American biographers
20th-century male writers